Huangjiang or Huang Jiang may refer to:

 Huangjiang, Guangdong, town and subdivision of Dongguan, Guangdong
The Swordswoman of Huangjiang, a wuxia series
Huangjiang, called yellow soybean paste in English
Huang River (Guizhou) (zh), right tributary of the upper Long River in the Qiannan Prefecture of Guizhou
Huang River (Guangdong) (zh),  river in Shanwei, Guangdong